The 5th National Hockey League All-Star Game took place at Maple Leaf Gardens, home of the Toronto Maple Leafs, on October 9, 1951. Two teams of all-star players played to a 2–2 tie.

Change in format
The format was different from the one before it, largely because due to the nomination of five Detroit Red Wings players to the First and Second Team All-Stars which led to a 7–1 loss the year before. The same critics of the previous format's 7–1 outcome equally lamented the two-all tie in this game, with many suggesting that overtime be implemented.

The new format had the First Team All-Stars and the Second Team All-Stars be the cores of the two teams playing in the all-star game, with the reserves for the First Team consisting of players on American-based teams and the Second Team reserves consisting of Habs and Leafs. Because of the new format, the First Team All-Stars wore the red jerseys worn in previous All-Star Games, while the Second Team wore a white version featuring red and blue stripes and a blue NHL shield.

The 1951 game was held in somewhat of a sombre mood, as Bill Barilko, who had scored the Cup-winning goal for the Leafs, had mysteriously disappeared in a plane accident two months before. Had he been around, he would have been made a member of the Second Team
As the All-Star game was symbolic of the start of the season, many new rule changes also had their first looks in this game: the most notable being touch icing: that a defensive player (other than the goaltender) must touch the puck for icing calls (previously, only goaltenders were permitted to touch the puck on icing calls).

Other notable firsts include the first time that the Vezina Trophy winner (Al Rollins) would be absent from the game, as Second Team coach Dick Irvin chose his own player Gerry McNeil, who was in goal when Barilko scored the Cup-winning goal.

The game

Summary

 Referee: Bill Chadwick
 Linesmen: Sammy Babcock, Scotty Morrison
 Attendance: 11,469

Source: Podnieks(2000), p. 43.

Rosters

See also
1951–52 NHL season

References
 

05th National Hockey League All-Star Game
All
Ice hockey competitions in Toronto
1951 in Ontario
October 1951 sports events in Canada
1950s in Toronto